Shego is a fictional character from Disney's animated television series Kim Possible, voiced by Nicole Sullivan. The character, ever since her first appearance in the pilot episode, "Crush," appears as Dr. Drakken's sidekick, though in some episodes Shego acts as a mercenary for other villains. She is one of the franchise's main antagonists, and one of its most recurring characters. She made her live-action debut appearance in the 2019 film Kim Possible, portrayed by Taylor Ortega.

Personality

Shego is one of the most mature characters in the franchise; unlike most other Kim Possible villains, she is not afflicted with megalomania or narcissism. However, despite her generally rational and sane demeanor, she is frequently impatient and quick to anger, especially when she feels that someone is being obnoxious, stupid, or a waste of her time; her brother, Hego, once summed her up as a "cranky smart-mouth, prone to excessive violence."

As a villain, Shego is dedicated to her work, but often appears unmotivated and unambitious, dividing her free time between lounging in Drakken's lair reading villain magazines, filing her clawed gloves, and vacationing at spa resorts. For the most part, she does not initiate any schemes of her own, instead preferring to assist others as an enforcer or infiltrator. Despite being one of the smartest villains (or perhaps because of this fact), she generally prefers direct tactics—often involving physical force or intimidation—instead of high technology gadgets and overly complicated schemes. Because of her effectiveness as a sidekick, Shego appears to be well respected among the villain community, as some of them have broken her out of prison in order to enlist her assistance; nevertheless, Shego has nothing but contempt for the franchise's other villains.

Despite her fearsome persona, Shego is one of the few antagonists in the franchise who have a moral compass: she has expressed concern over cruelty to animals and pauses at the thought of stealing a wheelchair from a handicapped boy, stating that it is a low act even for villains such as Drakken; however, she usually puts aside her misgivings once a plan appears to be working out. Shego has never actually killed anyone on the show, though she has demonstrated a callous disregard for human life; once, while partnered with Motor Ed, who earlier commented on Shego's "appetite for destruction", she excitedly remarked that the shockwave resulting from a high-powered rocket reaching full speed would "doom the world to chaos!"

Appearance

Shego is a woman with long black hair, an athletic build, sharp jawline, and slanted bright green eyes. She is about half a foot taller than Kim. Her exact age remains unknown, though she is thought to be in her early 20's, and it was revealed that she is a college graduate (unspecified degree in child development).

As a result of being struck by a glowing, rainbow colored comet as a child (see below) her skin has a pale green tinge. Her signature costume is a green and black full-body catsuit with matching gloves and boots, arranged in a harlequin's dazzle pattern. The gloves are tipped with metal claws, which she has occasionally been seen filing to keep sharp. On the occasions when Shego has been seen to wear different outfits, they typically follow the same color scheme as her signature outfit. In the Kim Possible movie A Sitch In Time: Future Story, Shego conquers Middleton and she wears the same color with a matching black cape.

In the 2019 Kim Possible film Shego is seen as not having the power of energy protection organically, she uses energy gauntlets instead. In this film, she is also not green, having the skin colour of a normal human.

Powers and abilities
Shego is an expert in many fields, with infiltration and sabotage as her specialties. She possesses extensive martial arts training and impressive fitness and agility, rivaling the skills displayed by her nemesis Kim Possible. Her attack is also enhanced by metal claws on her gloves, and on occasion she has used her claw-like fingernails to similar effect. She is often seen filing them.

Shego is endowed with a unique superpower: the ability to generate green, flame-like bolts of glowing energy from her hands. This energy can be used to heat or melt anything she touches, or fired as a directed energy attack ranging from laser precision to a destructive blast. Originally, Disney described Shego's green flames as being purely concussive in nature, although in later episodes she was shown using her flames to burn or melt things. These powers were first stated by Disney as being generated by her gloves, making them a weapon rather than a superpower. However, this fact was retroactively changed during the show's second season, when these abilities were revealed to be a true superpower resulting from exposure to a rainbow-hued comet which also empowered her four brothers.

In addition to her energy attack, Shego appears to possess superhuman durability that allows her to survive situations of calamitous destruction that would probably kill other characters. In the film So the Drama, she was kicked into a live electrical signal tower, which shocked her and then proceeded to collapse on top of her. She came out of the incident with slightly torn clothes and frazzled hair.

Series history
Very little is known about Shego's early life and even her real name is never revealed. At some unknown point prior to the start of the series, a rainbow-colored comet smashed into Shego's childhood tree house, and endowed her and her four brothers with super powers. She then became a hero who, alongside her four brothers, defended Go City against a number of villains as the superhero group Team Go. Shego eventually left the team for reasons that were never fully specified, but anecdotal evidence suggests there were three primary reasons: a fascination with villainy, crankiness, and irritation with her brothers. At some point, she abandoned her family and their quest for justice for a life as a mercenary-for-hire.

It is unknown what happened with Shego right after leaving her family, but from the beginning of the series Shego has been, for the most part, in the employ of Dr. Drakken as his sidekick and enforcer. It is during this stage of her life in which the series mostly revolves, leading her and Drakken to multiple confrontations against Kim Possible. Throughout the series, Shego is repeatedly defeated by Kim Possible and sent back to jail. She is (as previously mentioned) a formidable fighter and gets the better of Kim Possible a few times, whereupon her successes are usually stopped by Ron (often accidentally), Rufus, or, on occasion, bungling from Drakken or interference from his machinery.

In the second season, one of the most notable events involving Shego was her reunion with her brothers; she had to team up with her rival Kim to retrieve their powers, which had been stolen by an old enemy of hers, Aviarius. This was the first time the show took the time to detail bits of Shego's past, delving into her previously unknown background as a once-upon-a-time teenage heroine herself.

A notable curiosity in the series, Shego is the only villain who is never given all of her basic characteristics: she lacks a common name—being known only as Shego throughout the show's run—and her age is also difficult to place. (At times, she seems to older than Kim Possible, enjoying hip-hop music, fast cars, and handsome men; she critiques the heroine on her fashion and dating choices and is found attractive by both Ron and Senor Senior Junior, who are both of a high school-college age. Still, at other times she seems to be quite a bit older, having a complex college degree in child development, dating Mister Barkin, in Sitch in Time, Shego has the same white stripe in her hair as Drakken, Monkey Fist, and Kim's parents, indicating she's older, and being characterized by Ron as "older, like, a lot older!" Of course, this also comes in the same scene in "Clean Slate" where Shego tries to convince an amnesiac Kim that she was a senior while the heroine was a freshman.)

During the fourth season, Shego's character went through some development which pointed to the possibility that she may have been growing tired of her established role as a villainous sidekick. She walked out on two separate capers, and on two occasions she actually saved Kim's life. Shego states her reason for doing so is because nobody is allowed to kill Kim, except for her. Finally, at the series' end, she and Drakken team up with Kim and Ron to save the world from an alien invasion. Because of this, she is greeted as a heroine once again.

Relationships

Kim Possible

Shego has a powerful rivalry with Kim on the battlefield, which is sometimes kept at a "professional" context, but usually involves a few insults. This rivalry, however, progressed along the series, becoming more and more personal for both fighters.

Like Bonnie, Shego talks down to Kim as if she were a child, often referring to her by the diminutive "Kimmie" or nicknames like "Princess" or "Pumpkin", as well as putting down both her appearance and wardrobe. However,  Kim doesn't seem to be quite as affected by Shego's insults as with Bonnie's, and her retorts have a better effect against Shego. Over time, and despite their rivalry (or possibly because of it), Shego has developed a professional respect which she often shows for Kim as a rival and a fighter, and is less than impressed when she manages to ruin Drakken's scheme. In some instances they share a bond, especially when they are stuck in the same "sitch", usually leading to small and almost friendly conversations.

This relationship has somehow grown to be much more personal for Shego, also indicating a gradual development in her personality. In certain situations, Kim and Shego have teamed up against common enemies, and Shego has gone as far as to save Kim from other enemies, claiming that only she has the right to destroy her. It was even demonstrated during the events of "Stop Team Go" that they have the potential to be great friends, if only Shego weren't irritable (Shego even reveals to have been wanting to tell Kim something she couldn't while evil, though what this was is never revealed). In the episode "Mad Dogs & Aliens" Shego goes so far as to both rescue Kim from a gigantic alien who has incapacitated her, and to summon Ron and Kim's little brothers for assistance. At one point during "Stop Team Go", Kim referred to Shego as "like a big sister" (to which Ron responds, "Yes, a big sister who used to punch and kick you, AND MEAN IT!").

Drakken

Dr. Drakken is Shego's usual employer; she has been stated to be his sidekick. They have worked together for most of their schemes, but she rarely shows much concern over him even though he claims that he likes to think of them as some kind of "evil family". Their relationship teeters between a familiar, cooperative interaction and annoyance or frustration with each other.

As a sidekick, she started out in the series being respectful towards Drakken. As the franchise progressed, she began to develop a stronger personality and to openly show contempt for him. Eventually, Shego became the dominant one, and began threatening him with violence if he stepped over the line with her.

She is rarely taken aback when Dr. Drakken's plans are foiled – going so far as to chide him for making overly complex or unconventional plans. On the few occasions that such schemes appear to be working, she has been seen to be pleasantly surprised and appears to be happy for his minor successes. Even though Shego's tolerance for Drakken and his failure-prone evil schemes has steadily decreased, she still remains in his service, usually without much reluctance unless she wants a vacation from him or sees a better opportunity. In fact, she reacts badly when he twice replaces her with new sidekicks (Warmonga and Frugal Lucre). As poorly as she treats him, Shego sees her place as being in Drakken's employ and has proven to actually care for him. As per confirmation from show director Steve Loter, Drakken and Shego begin a romantic relationship after the series finale, Graduation. Kim has even joked with Shego that she had feelings for Drakken.

Señor Senior, Junior

Junior is one of the few characters that has managed to earn Shego's respect. Señor Senior Sr. hired Shego to teach his son Junior the finer points of villainy, and although the training practically started with complications, Junior eventually proved to be an apt pupil, and Shego a capable instructor. They may be in mutual pursuit of evil schemes, but their relationship seems to be based on a friendly teacher-student dynamic, although her loyalty towards him is rather questionable.

Shego is unusually cooperative and patient with Junior, and he is one of the few people who can bring out her softer side. Junior also sought Shego's help while developing a scheme on his own for impressing his father, and Shego willingly assisted. Together they showed the potential for being a formidable team, somewhat matching Kim and Ron. And unlike Drakken, Dementor, and the like, Shego has never struck or blasted Junior, a mark of trust from the cranky and violence-prone woman.

Family

Shego has four brothers: Hego, Mego, and a set of twins who were never identified in the first episode, but were later revealed to be called Wego. All of them granted with unique super-powers like her, which Hego referred to as a "Go-Team-Glow" in the episode "Go Team Go!". With them, she used to be part of Team Go. Her reasons for leaving the team and turning to evil are never fully examined, though two different views are offered: Hego claims that the more Team Go fought against evil, the more Shego came to like evil; while Shego strongly suggests that she left not because of any particular calling to villainy, but for the fact that her brothers' behavior and dysfunctions drove her away.

Shego has a huge resentment towards her brothers' attitude, finding them incompetent, argumentative, and irritating, and their dysfunctional and annoying relationship was part of the reason she abandoned Team Go's fight for justice to pursue evil. Her brothers, on the other hand, are fairly oblivious to the fact their sister has turned to a life of villainy; Hego has called her a "cranky smart mouth, prone to excessive violence", but still considers Shego to be good unconditionally (this is somewhat supported by her moral compass and camaraderies). Although the family has disagreements, in the episode "Go Team Go", Shego deserts Dr. Drakken to help her brothers regain their powers from minor villain "Avarius".

Shego apparently provided the brains and initiative of Team Go. It was through her efforts they kept focused and organized as a superhero team: when she left, Team Go collapsed into ineffectual bickering and soon disbanded. When they briefly, fully regrouped in "Stop Team Go" they quickly regained their fighting effectiveness.

Despite the fact that Shego claims to dislike her siblings and even though she would never admit it, it was strongly suggested that Shego still has a sense of familial love for them, as pointed out by both Kim and Drakken.

Motor Ed
Shego first encounters Motor Ed in the episode "Steal Wheels". She finds him extremely annoying because of his sexist attitudes and incessant attempts to hit on her. Her attempts to discourage him (up to and including attacking him with her energy blasts) only increase his infatuation.

When Momma Lipsky learns that Ed has been incarcerated, she brings him to her son Drew (Doctor Drakken, who she is not aware is also a villain) with the hopes of straightening him out. Shego finds their plan to steal a boy's wheelchair to be beyond even her low standards, and while she does allow the plan to occur, she takes no part in the theft, chiding them both for being particularly cruel and/or idiotic.

In the episode "Car Alarm", Motor Ed breaks Shego out of prison in hope that she would assist him in his latest scheme. She reluctantly agrees to help him. Motor Ed turns a stolen rocket into a vehicle capable of going fast enough to cause devastation wherever it goes. In the end, Shego finds out she was just an "accessory" and proceeds to assault him, with the end result of both falling out of the rocket-car and into a river, effectively foiling their own plans.

Alternative versions
In addition to the stock edition of Shego, her character and design has been modified on a number of occasions in order to fit in with specific plot devices and episodes.

The Supreme One

In the multipart episode A Sitch In Time (Aired in the US as a stand-alone TV movie), a future version of Shego was shown as the only Kim Possible villain ever to successfully take over the world.

Using the Tempus Simia, a mystical idol with the power to create portals through space-time, Shego, acting on the advice of her future self, managed to take over the world by making fruitful financial and criminal investments to strategically separating Kim and Ron, thus splitting up Team Possible and decreasing their effectiveness. This way, they failed to stop Shego from obtaining the idol and dragging them into the future, leaving the world for her to dominate.

Twenty years in the future, Shego, now known as The Supreme One, establishes Middleton as her capital, renaming it "Shegoton", and transforming Club Banana into "Club Shego". She has dissenters brainwashed in special totalitarian facilities (including and particularly the former high school) and everyone, aside from a small band of resistance fighters, wears a dress code based on Shego's green and black costume.

Although mostly the same, this version of Shego appeared to be much crueler and more evil than her present self as well as more criminally sophisticated, using her subordinates (other villains) to fight her enemies instead of doing it herself ("the Supreme One always delegates!"). She proves to be a seemingly capable Overlord in her delegations, capturing all of the rebels as well as Kim, Ron, and Rufus by sending her minions after them (Killigan, Drakken, and Monkey Fist). It was only when she began listening to Drakken's inane "tips" about how to gloat and boast that she becomes distracted, allowing the heroes to destroy the time monkey, undoing all of her victories and erasing her from history in the process.

Miss Go (1) 
In the season 3 episode "Rewriting History", A young woman named Miss Go helps Bartholomew Lipsky (ancestor of Drew "Drakken" Lipsky) to steal an experimental device from Professor DeMenz (ancestor of Professor Dementor). In the process, she permanently sullies the good name of Miriam "Mim" Possible (ancestor to Kim), who is forced to go into hiding in shame. While this Miss Go lacks any apparent super-powers, she is still a remarkably gifted thief and hand-to-hand combatant, even while fighting in period-appropriate attire such as a corset, broad hat, and billowing skirt. She fights Miriam to a standstill while moving throughout the Middleton World's Fair, and eventually manages to escape with Lipsky.

Whether or not Miss Go ever truly existed is left unclear, as the episode ends in the trope of "It was all a dream;" only to show up in references in following episodes such as "Emotion Sickness" that at least some aspects, such as the existence of Jonathan Stoppable and the Taco Stand were probably real.

Miss Go (2)
In the Season 4 episode "Stop Team Go", Shego temporarily lost her crankiness to an enhanced version of Jack Hench's Attitudinator, wielded by an old enemy of Team Go, the techno-powered villainess Electronique. Electronique's plan had originally been to turn all of the members of Team Go evil, but since Shego was already evil, she was turned good instead.

Assuming the alias Miss Go, Shego used her degree in child development to land a job as a substitute teacher at Middleton High School, taking over one of Kim's classes. As Miss Go, Shego is a genuinely kind, caring and even airheadedly girly person who is into shopping and romantic movies. She has a lot in common with Kim and the two quickly become close friends, with Kim going so far as to describe her as being "like a big sister." Shego also attracts the attention of fellow substitute teacher Steve Barkin, and they enjoyed a brief romance.

At the end of the episode, Shego was accidentally transformed back to her original self by Ron, and the Attitudinator is damaged beyond repair. Right after this, Shego rejoins with Drakken, who spent the episode failing to get a pickle jar open without her (she eventually opens the jar with great upset, to which Drakken retorts, "Oh, sure, after I loosened it!"). Towards the episode's close, she is seen looking wistfully at a strip of photo booth pictures of Kim and herself, suggesting that she might have regrets about losing their brief friendship; she then burns the pictures as Drakken approaches, apparently because she did not want him to see them. Later during the credits Barkin tries to win her back; though she considers it at the beginning, as soon as he started to sing, she used the lair's defense system on him.

Creation and reception
Initially, Shego was meant to be "just" Dr. Drakken's sidekick, designed with green and black as what the creators considered to be known as "bad colors". However, it was after hearing Nicole Sullivan's performance as Shego that they started to develop her unique relationship with Drakken, as Nicole portrayed Shego as sarcastic and smarter than Drakken, which prevailed along the series as trademark, even though the characters' voice actors had already worked together in Buzz Lightyear of Star Command. Originally, Shego wasn't included in the first versions of the pilot episode of Kim Possible ("Crush"), but was added in later versions of it.

Shego has become the most popular villain of the series as well as one of its most popular characters, and also one of the main character's most popular love interests among fan art and fan fiction. Her popularity led the authors of the series to keep her, alongside Drakken, as one of the most recurring characters, even though they had intended to work less with them; the duo are thus regarded as Kim Possible's arch-nemeses.

Besides being one of the most recurring characters of the franchise, Shego is one of the few characters who has had appearances outside the series. She appeared in the Lilo & Stitch: The Series crossover episode entitled “Rufus”, again as Drakken's sidekick in his attempt to kidnap Stitch. She also appeared in almost every Kim Possible video game, most notably in What's the Switch?, where she is a playable character alongside Kim and covers up half of the adventure. For gameplay purposes, her powers in said game are portrayed as being electromagnetic rather than thermal.

The Spanish all-female punk band Shego is named after her.

References

Female supervillains
Television characters introduced in 2002
Animated characters introduced in 2002
Fictional characters with fire or heat abilities
Fictional henchmen
Fictional female martial artists
Fictional mercenaries
Fictional women soldiers and warriors
Fictional Ninjutsu practitioners
Kim Possible characters
Television sidekicks
Martial artist characters in television
Crossover characters in television
Disney animated villains
Villains in animated television series
Female characters in animated series
Female characters in animation
Animated human characters

sv:Kim Possible#Skurkar